The 1979 Pacific hurricane season was an inactive season, featuring 10 named storms, 6 hurricanes, and 4 major hurricanes. It featured zero tropical cyclones in the Central Pacific, the most recent occurrence on record as of 2021. An average year sees four to five tropical cyclones in that basin.

Seasonal activity in 1979 remained within the confines of a traditional hurricane season, which begins on May 15 and ends on November 30 in the East Pacific basin. Those dates conventionally delimit the period during each year when most tropical cyclones occur. The season's first system, Andres, developed on May 31, while the year's final cyclone, Jimena, dissipated on November 18. In early June, Andres moved onshore Mexico as a minimal hurricane, while in late October, Ignacio struck the coastline as a tropical depression. Impacts from those storms were minimal, as were the effects of the preponderance of systems during the season. No casualties or damage were reported onshore, but two fishermen drowned offshore.



Systems

Hurricane Andres 

A tropical disturbance developed south of the Gulf of Tehuantepec early on May 31, and became a tropical depression at 18:00 UTC that day. The system coalesced into Tropical Storm Andres by 06:00 UTC on June 2 as it curved from west to north-northwest. It then became the season's first hurricane around 18:00 UTC on June 3. Later that day, forecasters observed a small eye on visible satellite imagery. One of many ships encountered the storm after this time, measuring an inner core  in radius. The cyclone attained its peak as a Category 2 hurricane with winds of  around 00:00 UTC on June 4. The system transitioned into an extratropical cyclone five hours later.

All flights inbound to Acapulco, Guerrero, were canceled on June 3 but resumed the next day following Andres' passage. Torrential rainfall triggered flooding which inundated homes and floated cars left on streets. High winds also downed power lines, leaving many residents without electricity. Offshore, two fishermen were killed after their boat capsized amidst rough seas. The crew of a cargo ship rescued four people from the luxury yacht Florida II, which sank.

Tropical Storm Blanca 

A westward-moving tropical disturbance crossed Costa Rica and Panama into the East Pacific on June 17. The system was slow to organize initially, but developed into a tropical depression by 06:00 UTC on June 21. It further intensified and became Tropical Storm Blanca around 00:00 UTC on June 22. The cyclone curved west-northwest and began to weaken, particularly after it encountered colder waters. It dissipated far away from land after 12:00 UTC on June 25.

Tropical Storm Carlos 

A tropical disturbance formed in the Gulf of Tehuantepec on July 11 and developed into a tropical depression around 18:00 UTC on July 14. The cyclone dissipated southwest of Baja California Sur after 06:00 UTC on July 16.

Hurricane Dolores 

An area of disturbed weather was observed south of Guatemala on July 14. It developed into a tropical depression around 06:00 UTC on July 17 and became Tropical Storm Dolores twelve hours later. Moving along the south side of an upper-level area of high pressure, the cyclone passed over warm waters which facilitated its continued development. It became a hurricane at 18:00 UTC on July 18 and then entered a period of rapid intensification, which coincided with the formation of a well-defined eye on satellite imagery. Dolores strengthened into the season's first major hurricane around 06:00 UTC on July 20 and, after a brief fluctuation in intensity, attained peak winds of  early on July 21. High pressure shifted northeast into northern Mexico, causing Dolores to curve northwest into cooler waters and drier air. The system dissipated well to the west of Baja California after 18:00 UTC on July 23.

Hurricane Enrique 

After a nearly month-long dearth in tropical-cyclone activity, a new tropical depression formed over the open East Pacific around 18:00 UTC on August 17. It moved west over very warm waters, intensifying into Tropical Storm Enrique six hours after formation, and into a hurricane by 00:00 UTC on August 19. After maintaining that strength for a few days, the cyclone encountered dry air and slightly cooler waters, which caused it to weaken to a tropical storm. Enrique soon moved into a more conducive environment again, however, and began rapid intensification. Enrique moved toward the northwest, and that trajectory brought the storm over cold waters once again, resulting in rapid weakening. The system dissipated after 18:00 UTC on August 24.

Hurricane Fefa 

A tropical disturbance developed south-southeast of Acapulco on August 19. Positioned on the south side of upper-level ridging, the system moved swiftly west-northwest and organized into a tropical depression around 00:00 UTC on August 21. Continued development over very warm waters allowed the depression to become Tropical Storm Fefa within six hours, which then intensified into a hurricane by 06:00 UTC on August 22. Later that day, Fefa developed a well-defined eye. A persistent, rapid west-northwest track brought Fefa over increasingly cool waters, which caused weakening. The system dissipated over the open East Pacific after 00:00 UTC on August 25.

Hurricane Guillermo 

An area of disturbed weather formed south of the Gulf of Tehuantepec on September 7. It organized into a tropical depression around 18:00 UTC on September 8 and intensified into Tropical Storm Guillermo twelve hours later. Flow around the southwest side of upper-level ridging directed the storm to curve northwestward, while the system's track over warm waters allowed it to intensify. It became a hurricane with peak winds of  around 18:00 UTC on September 11. Guillermo decelerated over cooler waters south of Baja California, ultimately dissipating after 12:00 UTC on September 13.

Tropical Storm Hilda 

On October 1, an area of disturbed weather developed south of Guatemala. It moved west, coalescing into a tropical depression by 00:00 UTC on October 4. A westward track brought the cyclone over cooler waters, and the brief system dissipated over the open East Pacific after 18:00 UTC on October 6.

Hurricane Ignacio 

Over two weeks after the dissipation of Hilda, a new tropical disturbance formed southwest of Guatemala on October 22. It tracked steadily westward, becoming a tropical depression around 18:00 UTC on October 23 and Tropical Storm Ignacio at 12:00 UTC the next day. A curve toward the northwest brought the cyclone over progressively warmer waters, and it reached hurricane intensity around 18:00 UTC on October 26. Ignacio soon thereafter began a period of rapid intensification, vaulting from Category 2 to Category 4 intensity within six hours. A United States Air Force reconnaissance plane investigated the powerful storm at 18:00 UTC on October 27, finding peak winds of  – tied with Enrique as the strongest of the season – as well as a 25-mile (35-km) diameter eye covered only by broken low-level clouds.

Ignacio turned north and then veered sharply east, entering colder waters. It transitioned into an extratropical cyclone six hours later, then dissipated over the Yucatán Peninsula the next day.

Tropical Storm Jimena 

The final storm of the 1979 season began as a tropical disturbance south of Panama on November 13. The system moved generally westward and organized into a tropical depression around 06:00 UTC on November 15. Warm waters aided in the depression's development, and it became Tropical Storm Jimena by 00:00 UTC on November 16. The cyclone's winds peaked at  around 18:00 UTC that day. Afterwards, cold and dry northerly winds flowing across the Gulf of Tehuantepec began to affect Jimena, causing it to weaken. The system's center dissipated after 06:00 UTC on November 18, though its remnants were evident on satellite imagery for another three days.

Other systems
Several unofficial tropical depressions accompanied the documented cyclones in 1979. Shortly before the formation of Andres, a tropical depression developed south of Manzanillo on May 31. It curved northwest into cooler waters and dissipated on June 1. Another tropical depression was identified north of Carlos on July 16. It weakened over cold waters almost immediately, however, dissipating around 12:00 UTC that day just offshore Baja California Sur. The last documented tropical depression formed on September 4 south of the Gulf of the Tehuantepec. It dissipated rapidly once inland.

Storm names 
The following names were used for named storms that formed in the East Pacific in 1979. Names that were not assigned are marked in gray.

Season effects
This is a table of all the storms that formed in the 1979 Pacific hurricane season. It includes their duration, names, affected areas, damages, and death totals. Damage and deaths include totals while the storm was extratropical, a tropical wave, or a low, and all the damage figures are in USD.

See also 

 List of Pacific hurricanes
 Pacific hurricane season
 1979 Atlantic hurricane season
 1979 Pacific typhoon season
 1979 North Indian Ocean cyclone season
 Southern Hemisphere tropical cyclone seasons: 1978–79, 1979–80

Notes

References

External links 
 Central Pacific Hurricane Center's seasonal summary

 
Pacific hurricane seasons
Articles which contain graphical timelines